Zhdanov, Armenia may refer to:
Zhdanov, Armavir
Zhdanov, Lori

See also
Zhdanov (disambiguation)